HMS St Albans was a 60-gun fourth rate ship of the line of the Royal Navy, built at Deptford Dockyard to the draught specified by the 1745 Establishment, and launched on 23 December 1747.

St Albans served until 1765, when she was sold out of the Navy.

Notes

References

External links
 

Ships of the line of the Royal Navy
1747 ships